Jeppe Okkels (born 27 July 1999) is a Danish professional footballer who plays as a left winger for Allsvenskan club IF Elfsborg.

Career

Silkeborg
Jeppe Okkels started playing football at the age of 3–4 and moved from ØBG Silkeborg to Silkeborg IF at the age of 12, joining the club's under-13s. During the summer of 2014, he signed his first contract with Silkeborg and was called up for the U16 national team.

In the April 2015, Okkels went on a one-week trial with German Bundesliga club Bayern Munich.

Okkels made his Danish 1st Division and Silkeborg debut on 28 May 2016. Okkels started on the bench, but replaced Mikkel Vendelbo in the 67th minute in a 5–0 victory against Vejle Boldklub.

IF Elfsborg
On 26 August 2020 it was confirmed, that Okkels had joined Swedish Allsvenskan club IF Elfsborg on a deal until the end of 2024.

References

External links

1999 births
Living people
People from Silkeborg
Danish men's footballers
Danish expatriate men's footballers
Danish Superliga players
Danish 1st Division players
Allsvenskan players
Silkeborg IF players
IF Elfsborg players
Denmark youth international footballers
Association football wingers
Danish expatriate sportspeople in Sweden
Expatriate footballers in Sweden
Sportspeople from the Central Denmark Region